Khaled Narey (born 23 July 1994) is a German professional footballer who plays as a winger for Super League Greece and club PAOK
.

Early life
Narey was born in Neuwied, Rhineland-Palatinate, and grew up in Leverkusen. His parents come from Togo, but he only holds German citizenship.

Club career

Early career
Narey played youth football for SV Bergfried Leverkusen-Steinbüchel from June 2003 to 30 June 2008. After moving to Bayer Leverkusen in 2010, he was promoted from their U19 team to the reserves ahead of the 2013–14 season, and developed into a regular player. He played there for a total of four years before moving to Borussia Dortmund. Narey joined Borussia Dortmund II in 2014 from Bayer Leverkusen. He made his professional debut in the 3. Liga on 26 July 2014 against Rot-Weiß Erfurt.and was even part of the squad for the black and yellow licensed team at the start of the Bundesliga this season. He was loaned to Paderborn, where he became a regular in league two in the second half of the season. Narey joined Greuther Fürth on 1 July 2016 on a three-year contract and played in 70 matches, scoring eight goals and providing seven assists.

Hamburger SV
For the 2018–19 season, Narey moved to Hamburger SV. He signed for the newly relegated 2. Bundesliga club, agreeing on a four-year contract. Under head coaches Christian Titz and Hannes Wolf, he established himself as a regular starter as a winger to finish with 32 league appearances (28 starts). With seven league goals, he was only behind Pierre-Michel Lasogga (13 goals), to become the second highest goalscorer of a HSV team, which missed out on direct promotion with a 4th-place finish. Despite being a key member of the team with 84 appearances, 11 goals and 9 assists, the fact that Hamburg was reaching the well but not drinking the water, coupled with the introversion in the team and the constant changes of coaches led him again to look for a new challenge in his career.

Fortuna Düsseldorf
In the summer of 2021, Narey signed a two-year contract with Fortuna Düsseldorf. He enjoyed a stellar season, as he scored 8 goals and provided 15 assists in 31 matches in Germany's 2. Bundesliga.

PAOK
After weeks of waiting and hard "bargaining", the Thessalonikians managed to reach an agreement with the German team for the acquisition of the 27-year-old German winger, with the "Double-headed eagle" paying around €1.5m plus €250k in bonuses and a 10% share in possible future transfer fees.

International career
Narey was born in Germany to Togolese parents. He was called up to the Togo national football team in October 2016.

Career statistics

Club

Honours

Individual
2.Bundesliga Top assist provider: 2021–22

References

External links
 

1994 births
Living people
German footballers
German expatriate footballers
German people of Togolese descent
Bayer 04 Leverkusen II players
Borussia Dortmund II players
SC Paderborn 07 players
SpVgg Greuther Fürth players
Hamburger SV players
Fortuna Düsseldorf players
Association football defenders
Bundesliga players
2. Bundesliga players
3. Liga players
People from Neuwied
Footballers from Rhineland-Palatinate
Super League Greece players
PAOK FC players
German expatriate sportspeople in Greece
Expatriate footballers in Greece